John King is an English writer best known for his novels which, for the most part, deal in the more rebellious elements driving the country's culture. His stories carry strong social and political undercurrents, and his work has been widely translated abroad. He has written articles and reviews for alternative and mainstream publications, edits the fiction journal Verbal, and is the co-owner of the London Books publishing house.

Career

Novels
King's 1996 debut novel, The Football Factory, was an instant word-of-mouth success, selling around 300,000 copies in the UK. The book was subsequently turned into a play by Brighton Theatre Events, with German and Dutch adaptations following. A film adaptation appeared in 2004. Directed by Nick Love and starring Danny Dyer, Dudley Sutton, and Frank Harper, its UK DVD sales passed the two-million mark.

Prior to the novel's release, an early version of the chapter "Millwall Away" appeared in Rebel Inc. This magazine also published early writing by Irvine Welsh and Alan Warner, and all three would subsequently join the Jonathan Cape publishing house. King was producing the fanzine Two Sevens, and Rebel Inc editor Kevin Williamson's fiction was featured, along with interviews with Welsh and the novelist Stewart Home. Following its publication, extracts from The Football Factory featured in issue 59 of the New York literary journal Grand Street.

Two more novels —Headhunters and England Away—develop the themes of alienation and belonging found in The Football Factory, and the three books form a loose trilogy. Street newspaper The Big Issue described Headhunters as: "Sexy, dirty, violent, sad and funny; in fact, it has just about everything you could want from a book on contemporary working-class life in London".

King's fourth novel, Human Punk (2000), draws on the emergence and evolution of punk rock as it tells the story of four boyhood friends; it is set in and around the town of Slough.

White Trash (2002), which the author has described as "a defence of the NHS", drew the following praise from Alan Sillitoe, author of Saturday Night and Sunday Morning: "Complete and unique, all stitched up and marvellous, the two sides of the equation brought together, realistic yet philosophical". In The Independent, Mat Coward wrote: "The cumulative effect of King's style, with streams of monologue, alternating between Ruby and Jeffreys, is astonishingly powerful in its detail and depth... This is an immensely timely and necessary book: stylish, witty and passionate. It's about time someone slapped the smugness from the face of broadsheet Britain".

The one novel of King's to be set entirely outside England, The Prison House (2004), takes place in an old castle prison in an unnamed country. Brian Keenan wrote: "With a brutal imagination The Prison House takes you to a place where angels fear to tread. Go there and be redeemed". Boyd Tonkin, writing in The Independent, said: "In this literary jail, the ghost of Kafka shares a cell with the shade of Burroughs".

Skinheads (2008) is set in the same landscapes as Human Punk and White Trash, and while the three books feature different characters, they effectively combine to provide an overview of forty years of British culture and politics as The Satellite Cycle. In his review of the novel, Charles Shaar Murray stated: "John King's achievement since his debut has been enormous: creating a modern, proletarian English literature at once genuinely modern, genuinely proletarian, genuinely literature". The US edition of Human Punk carries the following quote by Lars Frederiksen of the American punk band Rancid: "John King: the face in our subculture who lives what he writes".

In 2016, King published his eighth novel, The Liberal Politics of Adolf Hitler, which is set fifty years in the future. The Morning Star wrote: "King steadily constructs, layer by layer, an increasingly believable world where a combination of intrusive technology, ruthlessness and effectively bland public relations has ensured the domination of the majority's thoughts and actions." Author David Peace called it "One of the best, if not the best, bravest and most exciting books I've read in years—needed saying, needed writing and needs to be read".

King's ninth novel, Slaughterhouse Prayer (2018), is an animal rights story set around three stages in the life of the main character, and how he responds to the meat and dairy industries as a boy, youth, and man. TV producer/author Ben Richards described the novel as "A masterpiece in the tradition of Upton Sinclair and Victor Hugo". Poet and author Benjamin Zephaniah said: "Slaughterhouse Prayer is a fiction that reveals many truths. Written from a compassionate place, it is sensitive, thoughtful, and there is nothing like it out there".

A new novel, London Country, is due to be published in 2023.

Other writing and activities
In 2007, King set up the independent publishing company London Books with Martin Knight.

King has written for a range of newspapers, magazines, and fanzines over the years, and has contributed to New Statesman in the UK, la Repubblica in Italy, and Le Monde in France. His small-press publication Verbal publishes new fiction and includes an author interview in each issue. A supporter of British withdrawal from the EU, his New Statesman articles A Very Corporate Coup and Flying the Flag were widely commented upon.

In 2020, the novella The Beasts of Brussels was published as part of The Seal Club, a three-novella collection that also includes The Providers by Irvine Welsh and Those Darker Sayings by Alan Warner. Reviewing the book, The Scotsman described it as "A page-turning triptych of fast-flowing tales soaked in booze, dark humour, violence and the paradoxes of masculinity".

Bibliography

Novels
 The Football Factory (1996)
 Headhunters (1998)
 England Away (1999)
 Human Punk (2000)
 White Trash (2002)
 The Prison House (2004)
 Skinheads (2008)
 The Liberal Politics of Adolf Hitler (2016)
 Slaughterhouse Prayer (2018)

Novellas
 The Beasts of Brussels (The Seal Club, 2020)

Short stories
 "Millwall Away" (Rebel Inc., 1995)
 "Last Rites" (Rovers Return, 1998)
 "Space Junk" (Intoxication, 1998)
 "Bulldog Bobby" (Verbal, 2000)
 "Last Train Home" (la Repubblica, 2008)
 "The Penalty" (High Life, 2010)
 "See No Evil" (More Raw Material, 2015)
 "The Terror Fantastic" (PUSH 2, 2015)
 "Blue-Eyed Girl" (Twenty Shades of Psycho, 2016)
 "Friday Night" (w/Jaimie MacDonald, Hull International Photography Festival, 2017)
 "Hard but Fair" (Denizen  of the Dead, 2020)
 "Drawing Breath" (The Middle of a Sentence, 2020)
 "Johnny Wayne Rocks" (Songs from the Underground, 2022)

Nonfiction
 Repetitive Beat Generation (Interview/collected authors, ed. Steve Redhead, 1998)
 The Special Ones (Editor with Martin Knight, 2007)
 London Fictions (Essay/collected essays, ed. Andrew Whitehead & Jerry White, 2013)
 PUSH 2 (Interview/anthology, ed. Joe England, 2015)

Introductions
 "The Gentleman Footballer" (The Working Man's Ballet by Alan Hudson, 2017)
 "From Cradle to Grave" (White Trash, US edition, 2016)
 "In England's Fair City" (Headhunters, US edition, 2016)
 "Two Sevens Clash" (Human Punk, US edition, 2015)
 "Come Running After You" (The Football Factory, US edition, 2015)
 PUSH (Anthology, East London Press, 2014)
 May Day by John Sommerfield (London Classics, 2010)
 Night and the City by Gerald Kersh (London Classics, 2007 & British Fiction, 2020)
 The Road to Los Angeles by John Fante (Rebel Inc/Canongate, 2000)
 Hoolifan by Martin King and Martin Knight (Mainstream, 1999)

Critical studies
 Mark Schmitt: British White Trash: Figurations of Tainted Whiteness in the Novels of Irvine Welsh, Niall Griffiths and John King. Bielefeld: Transcript, 2018.

References

External links
 
  London Books official website
 The Common Breath interview
 The People Versus the Elite / Penguin
 Interview / Benjamin Brill (archived copy)
 The Football Factory film trailer

English writers
English editors
Living people
1960 births